Shiel is the name of:

 Derek Shiel (1939–2017) painter and sculptor
 Dylan Shiel (born 1993), footballer
 George Knox Shiel (1825–1893), Democratic US congressman
 Graham Shiel (born 1970), rugby coach
 John Shiel (1917–2013), professional footballer
 M. P. Shiel (1865–1947), British writer
 Richard Lalor Shiel (1791–1871), Irish politician, writer and orator
 Tim Shiel, musician

See also: Ó Siadhail

Places
 Glen Shiel, Scotland
 Loch Shiel, Scotland
 River Shiel, Scotland
 Shiel Bridge, Scotland
 Shiel Hill, Dunedin

See also
 Shiels
 The Works of M. P. Shiel
 Kevin O'Shiel (1891–1970), politician